The Southern Steam are a professional indoor football team and currently a member of Elite Indoor Football (EIF) since 2017.

The Steam joined X-League Indoor Football in 2013, as the Pennsylvania Steam based in Reading, Pennsylvania. Midway through the 2014 season, the Steam were sold to a Georgia ownership group, who moved the franchise to Savannah, Georgia, during the regular season. Following the 2014 season, the Steam joined American Indoor Football (AIF) for the 2015 season. After the 2016 season, the AIF folded leaving the Steam to search for a new league.

The Steam played their home games at the Martin Luther King Jr. Arena at the Savannah Civic Center. However, the City of Savannah stated in 2016 that the Steam could not return unless they pay all money owed to the city prior to returning. They began playing in nearby Statesboro instead, first outdoors and then in a converted warehouse for 2017 as the Southern Steam. In 2019, the Steam announced via Facebook they were relocating to Jacksonville, Florida, for the 2019 season citing lack of ticket sales.

Franchise history
It was announced in October 2013, that the Pennsylvania Steam would be joining X-League Indoor Football for its inaugural 2014 season, playing their home games at Santander Arena in Reading, Pennsylvania under head coach Shane Houser.

2014 season

After playing one road game as the Pennsylvania Steam, the franchise was sold by Missouri Sports Holdings to an ownership group led by Bobby Dammarell in Savannah, Georgia. The team played their remaining three road games as the Savannah Steam, while the four home games that were scheduled to take place in Reading, Pennsylvania were cancelled and counted as wins for the opposing teams.

2015 season

It was announced in December 2014, that the Savannah Steam were joining American Indoor Football for the 2015 season, playing their home games at Tiger Arena. However, the Steam eventually played their home games at DeVaul Henderson Park, an outdoor park in Richmond Hill, Georgia. They finished the regular season 5-2, failing to qualify for the playoffs.

2016 season

For 2016, the Steam announced that they would be playing at the Savannah Civic Center. The team would run into severe financial troubles during this season with over $20,000 owed in rent for the use of the Civic Center and several unpaid sponsors. Eventually, the unpaid sponsors took their claims to the local sheriff's department in order to initiate an investigation and obtain the fees they were owed. In June 2016, general manager Jenny Dammarrel, wife of owner/head coach Bobby Dammarrel, first filed for Chapter 13 bankruptcy and then was later jailed after being charged with deposit account fraud for bad checks issued to players and staff. Despite the 2016 season's financial difficulties, a 3-5 record, and no wins over another AIF team (one forfeit win, one loss reversed based on ineligible players, and one win over a local semi-professional team), the Steam were still invited to the AIF playoffs against the Florida Tarpons. The Steam replaced the Myrtle Beach Freedom when the Freedom were asked to play against the West Michigan Ironmen when they lost their playoff opponent.

Elite Indoor Football
On July 18, 2016, the AIF announced it had ceased operations. On August 4, the Steam announced they were accepted into the new Elite Indoor Football. In fact, Elite Indoor Football is based at the same office in the Savannah suburb of Ellabell and its president is Robert Dammarell, also owner of the Steam, indicating that (like the Cape Fear Heroes did in creating Supreme Indoor Football) Dammarell and the Steam created their own league.

On August 17, 2016, the City of Savannah made it clear that the Steam could not return to the Civic Center for home games unless the Dammarrels paid all money owed to the city from the previous season; in any event, the Savannah Coastal Outlaws of United States Indoor Football and Arena Pro Football had already secured a lease on the Savannah Civic Center. The Steam had a cross-schedule agreement with Supreme Indoor Football to play games against some of its teams for the 2017 season.

Before starting their season, the Steam appeared to have rebranded to the Southern Steam. Once they starting playing EIF league games, they were listed as playing outdoors in nearby Statesboro. Later in the 2017 season, the team moved home games into a converted warehouse in Statesboro. In 2019, they moved to Jacksonville, Florida, and the Jacksonville Ice & Sportsplex.

Statistics and records

Season-by-season results
Note: The finish, wins, losses, and ties columns list regular season results and exclude any postseason play.

Head coaches' records
Note: Known statistics are correct through the end of the 2018 Elite Indoor Football season. This does not account for the 2017 or 2019 EIF season due to inadequate record keeping

References

External links
 Official website
 Old website

Former X-League Indoor Football teams
Former American Indoor Football teams
American football teams established in 2017
American football teams in Jacksonville, Florida
American football teams in Savannah, Georgia